Le Clown au Cirque is a tempera and pen and ink on board painting by Belarusian-French artist Marc Chagall created in 1980.

Description
The painting depicts floating clowns amid the circus ring in the middle of the performance. The subject of circus was dear to the artist. Chagall often returned to the circus as a subject matter in his artworks. He considered clowns, acrobats and actors as tragically human beings who are like characters in certain religious paintings. 

Among other Post-Impressionist and Modern painters who featured the circus in their works are Seurat, Toulouse-Lautrec, Picasso, Rouault, Van Dongen and Léger.

Provenance
 Chalk & Vermilion Fine Art, Greenwich
 Coast Galleries, Carmel
 Private Collection, Ohio (acquired in 2000)
 Weinstein Gallery, San Francisco
 Private Collection (acquired in 2015)

See also
List of artworks by Marc Chagall

References

1980 paintings
Paintings by Marc Chagall
Clowns in art
Musical instruments in art